The Utah Construction Company was a construction company founded by Edmund Orson Wattis Jr., Warren L. Wattis and William. H. Wattis in 1900.

History

A short four years after its founding, the company was awarded the contract to build the Feather River train route between Oakland and Salt Lake City. This $60 million contract was challenging, but after five years, very profitable. The Feather River route was completed for the Western Pacific Railroad in 1911. The Utah Construction Company thrived and soon captured a large share of the tunneling, grading, and track projects for the rapidly expanding railroads in the mountain west. Seeing the end of railroad expansion, the Wattis Brothers looked for ways to diversify their construction risks. 

In 1917, Utah Construction Company was awarded the $7 million O'Shaughnessy Dam contract, a controversial project that impounds the Tuolumne River in the Hetch Hetchy Valley of California's Sierra Nevada mountains. Success with the O'Shaughnessy Dam convinced the Wattis Brothers to bid on more dam projects. In 1922, Utah Construction Company formed a partnership with Morrison-Knudsen of Boise. With Frank Crowe as the chief engineer, the MK-UC partnership successfully built dams throughout the American west. 

In 1931, the Wattis Brothers spearheaded the formation of Six Companies to build the Hoover Dam, which was the largest construction project ever tackled by the US Government up to the time. Including the Hoover Dam, Utah Construction built 58 dams between 1916 and 1969. 

In 1942, several weeks after the Japanese bombing of Pearl Harbor, Japanese warships were sighted in Alaskan waters. No overland route existed connecting Alaska with the contiguous United States. This situation spurred the American Government to plan and build the Alaskan Army Highway, later renamed the Alaska Highway. US Army and civilian contractors, led by Utah Construction, completed the  arctic highway in just seven months and 17 days. 

In the 1950s, Utah Construction diversified into mining, becoming the Utah Construction & Mining Co. These ventures included the Marcona iron mine in Peru, the Lucky Mc uranium mine in Wyoming, and the Navajo coal mine and power plant in the Four Corners area of the United States southwest. 

Utah Construction also diversified into land development. Through acquisitions, Utah Construction purchased the Moraga Ranch in the San Francisco Bay Area. This 3,000 acre (12 km²) ranch was developed into Moraga, California.
c
The 1960s brought further military construction with Utah Construction, the lead contractor for the US Minuteman Missile hardened silos throughout the United States, as well as Construction of the Cheyenne Mountain Complex in Colorado Springs.

In 1969, Utah Construction went public on the New York Stock Exchange with the symbol UC. The construction business was sold to the Fluor Corporation in 1969. In 1971, the company changed its name to Utah International. The company merged with General Electric in 1976 for a value of over $2.2 billion, the largest corporate merger in history at that time. In 1984 General Electric sold the company to BHP.

The Wattis Brothers received funding from David Eccles, Thomas Dee, Joseph Clark and James Pingree families. Thomas Dee served as the first president of Utah Construction until his death in 1905, David Eccles served as the second president, and David Eccels' son Marriner became the president of Utah Construction concurrently with being the Federal Reserve chairman. The shareholders and Val Browning acquired the shares of Warren Wattis in the 1940s. The Wattis Brothers' original $8,000 investment in 1900 grew to $478 million after the 1976 acquisition by General Electric. Utah International may constructed a hydro electric power plant during 1960 at Bangladesh.

References

Sources 
 Sessions, Gene & Sterling. Utah International, A Biography of a Business.

External links 
 Wattis brothers, Hoover Dam History
 Stewart Library Collection, Utah Construction
A Guide to the Utah Construction Company Records, 2009-16. Special Collections, University Libraries, University of Nevada, Reno.

BHP
Companies formerly listed on the New York Stock Exchange
Construction and civil engineering companies established in 1900
Construction and civil engineering companies of the United States
General Electric
1900 establishments in Utah
1984 disestablishments in Utah
American companies disestablished in 1984
American companies established in 1900